The 1977 Major League Baseball All-Star Game was the 48th playing of the midsummer classic between the all-stars of the American League (AL) and National League (NL), the two leagues comprising Major League Baseball. The game was held on July 19, 1977, at Yankee Stadium in The Bronx, New York, New York the home of the New York Yankees of the American League. The game resulted in the National League defeating the American League 7–5.

The host Yankees won the World Series; the third time in history that a team hosting the All-Star Game would win the World Series in the same year. As of 2021, the 1977 Yankees were the last team to accomplish this.  The previous  teams to accomplish this were the 1939 New York Yankees and the 1959 Los Angeles Dodgers. Since 1977, this would have happened two other times, with the 2020 Los Angeles Dodgers, but the All-Star Game was canceled due to the COVID-19 pandemic, and the 2021 Atlanta Braves, but the All-Star Game was moved to Denver.

This was Yankee Stadium's third time as host of the All-Star Game, and it would be its last until 2008;  the last year of the park's use by the Yankees.

Rosters
Players in italics have since been inducted into the National Baseball Hall of Fame.

National League

American League

Game

Umpires

Starting lineups

Game summary

The National League started with Joe Morgan blasting American League starter Jim Palmer's sixth pitch into Yankee Stadium's "short porch" in right field. After Steve Garvey struck out, Dave Parker followed with a single and scored on a double by George Foster.  After Palmer wild-pitched Foster to third, Greg Luzinski made it 4–0 with a two-run homer. Steve Garvey then sent Palmer to the showers in the third with a homer to make it 5–0 in favor of the NL.

Meanwhile, National League starter Don Sutton cruised along with three shutout innings and Gary Lavelle added two more in the fourth and fifth. The American League first scored off of Tom Seaver in the sixth as Rod Carew led off with a single and went to second when Seaver stopped a lightning-fast shot up the middle hit by Willie Randolph. Seaver recovered to retire Randolph and retired George Brett, but then walked Fred Lynn and surrendered a two-run double to Richie Zisk.  Seaver allowed the AL another run in the seventh when Butch Wynegar led off with a single, took second when Graig Nettles reached on an error, and scored on a single by Randolph.

The National League got their final runs in the eighth when Dave Winfield hit a two-run single off Sparky Lyle. George Scott hit a two-run homer in the ninth for the AL off Rich Gossage for the final margin.

Footnotes and references

External links
Baseball-Reference.com
Lineups, boxscore, and more

Major League Baseball All-Star Game
Major League Baseball All-Star Game
Baseball in New York City
Sports in the Bronx
Major League Baseball All-Star
Sports competitions in New York City
Major League Baseball All-Star Game
1970s in the Bronx